Leigh Davenport is an American writer and producer. She is the creator of Run the World, and the writer of the films Wendy Williams: The Movie and The Perfect Find.

Life and career 
Davenport was born and raised in Chicago. She received her bachelor's degree from Spelman College. She moved to Harlem after graduation, where she began her career in digital media and entertainment journalism. In 2017, she was working as editorial director for HelloBeautiful.com when she decided to pursue a screenwriting career. Davenport's first writing job was for the Boomerang television adaptation. 

She eventually sold Run the World, a script she had worked on for a decade. The series, co-produced by Yvette Lee Bowser, follows a group of thirtysomething Black women living and working in Harlem. She loosely based the series on her own experiences living in New York for twelve years. The show has been compared to Sex and the City and Living Single for its focus on close female friendship. The first season received critical acclaim and was renewed by Starz in 2021.

Davenport wrote Wendy Williams: The Movie (2021) and the upcoming Netflix film The Perfect Find.

Davenport is married. She has two children.

Filmography

Television

Film

References

External links 
 Official website
 

Year of birth missing (living people)
Living people
21st-century African-American women
African-American women writers
Writers from Chicago
American women television producers
African-American screenwriters
Spelman College alumni